Inga jaunechensis is a species of plant in the family Fabaceae. It is found only in Ecuador. Its natural habitat is subtropical or tropical moist lowland forests.

References

jaunechensis
Flora of Ecuador
Endangered plants
Taxonomy articles created by Polbot